The Ways of Sin (Italian: Le vie del peccato) is a 1946 Italian historical melodrama film directed by Giorgio Pastina and starring Jacqueline Laurent, Leonardo Cortese and Carlo Ninchi. The film is a melodrama set in Sardinia at the beginning of the twentieth century. It is based on a novel by Grazia Deledda. The film was shot in the Apennine Mountains rather than Sardinia.

Cast
 Jacqueline Laurent as Ilaria 
 Leonardo Cortese as Don Roberto  
 Carlo Ninchi as Don Sebastiano Pinna  
 Ada Dondini as Eufemia Pinna 
 Laura Gore as Carla Pinna  
 Gualtiero Tumiati as Don Salvatore  
 Andrea Checchi as Rocco  
 Lauro Gazzolo as Il farmacista 
 Umberto Sacripante as Fausto, Il pastore 
 Michele Riccardini as Il sacerdote 
 Nino Pavese as Il brigadiere
 Franco Coop as Il notaio  
 Dante Maggio as La guardia carceraria  
 Rinalda Marchetti as L'amante di Don Sebastiano 
 Amalia Pellegrini as La domestica dei Pinna 
 Aldo Silvani as Il giudice istruttore

References

Bibliography
 Urban, Maria Bonaria. Sardinia on Screen: The Construction of the Sardinian Character in Italian Cinema. Rodopi, 2013.

External links 

1946 films
Italian historical drama films
1940s historical drama films
1940s Italian-language films
Films directed by Giorgio Pastina
Films shot in Sardinia
Films shot in Italy
Films set in the 1900s
Films based on Italian novels
Films based on works by Grazia Deledda
Italian black-and-white films
Melodrama films
1940s Italian films